"Help Me Out" is a 2017 song by Maroon 5.

Help Me Out may also refer to:
"Help Me Out", song by Bunny Walters (1978)
"Help Me Out", song by Saga from Silent Knight (1980)
"Help Me Out", single by the Clarks from I'll Tell You What Man... (1988) 
"Help Me Out", song by Christian rock band Superchic[k] from Karaoke Superstars (2001)
"Help Me Out", song by Black Rob from The Black Rob Report (2005)
"Help Me Out", single by Suzie McNeil from Rock-n-Roller (2008)
"Help Me Out", song by Crystal Kay from Color Change! (2008)
"Help Me Out", song by The Rocket Summer from Zoetic (2016)
"Help Me Out", song by Kings from Raplist (2020)

See also
"All These Things That I've Done", song by American rock band The Killers with common lyric of "you gotta help me out"